Austrolittorina antipodum, known as the banded periwinkle, is a species of small sea snail, a marine gastropod in the winkles and periwinkles family, Littorinidae. It is found in New Zealand. It occurs in New Zealand.

References

Sources
 Reid, D.G. & Williams, S.T. (2004) The subfamily Littorininae (Gastropoda: Littorinidae) in the temperate Southern Hemisphere: the genera Nodilittorina, Austrolittorina and Afrolittorina. Records of the Australian Museum 56: 75122
 WoRMS (2010). Austrolittorina antipodum (Philippi, 1847). In: Bouchet, P.; Gofas, S.; Rosenberg, G. (2010) World Marine Mollusca database. Accessed through: World Register of Marine Species at http://www.marinespecies.org/aphia.php?p=taxdetails&id=446839 on 2010-06-05

Littorinidae
Molluscs of the Pacific Ocean
Molluscs of Oceania
Gastropods of New Zealand
Gastropods described in 1847